Space research service (short: SRS |  also: space research radiocommunication service) is – according to Article 1.55 of the International Telecommunication Union's (ITU) Radio Regulations (RR) – defined as «A radiocommunication service in which spacecraft or other objects in space are used for scientific or technological research purposes.»

See also

Frequency allocation
The allocation of radio frequencies is provided according to Article 5 of the ITU Radio Regulations (edition 2012).

In order to improve harmonisation in spectrum utilisation, the majority of service-allocations stipulated in this document were incorporated in national Tables of Frequency Allocations and Utilisations which is with-in the responsibility of the appropriate national administration. The allocation might be primary, secondary, exclusive, and shared.
primary allocation:  is indicated by writing in capital letters (see example below)
secondary allocation: is indicated by small letters (see example below)
exclusive or shared utilization: is within the responsibility of administrations

 Example of frequency allocation

References / sources 

 International Telecommunication Union (ITU)

Radiocommunication services ITU